Vadim V. Schechtman (Вадим Шехтман, born 8 June 1954) is a Russian mathematician who teaches in Toulouse.

Schechtman received in 1979 from Moscow State University his doctorate under the supervision of Evgeny Golod. Schechtman was an academic at Moscow State University in the 1980s and at Stony Brook University in the 1990s. He is a now a professor at Paul Sabatier University (Toulouse III).

His research deals with algebraic geometry and quantum groups as well as with mathematical physics.

He has collaborated with Alexander Varchenko and Alexander Beilinson, among others.

Schechtman was an Invited Speaker with talk Sur les algèbres vertex attachées aux variétés algébriques at the International Congress of Mathematicians in Beijing in 2002.

Selected publications

References

External links
 mathnet.ru

20th-century Russian mathematicians
21st-century Russian mathematicians
Algebraic geometers
Moscow State University alumni
1954 births
Living people